Buxus microphylla, the Japanese box or littleleaf box, is a species of flowering plant in the box family 
found in Japan and Taiwan.

Description
In the case of Buxus microphylla var. japonica, the tree height is usually 1-3 m, but it can reach up to about 4 m; in rare cases it grows to 10 m. The trunk is upright and about 10 cm thick, and the bark is grayish white to pale brown.

The species was first described from Japanese cultivated plants of an unknown origin. They are unknown in the wild.

Taxonomy
The scientific name for Japanese box is Buxus microphylla var. japonica. Plants from Taiwan are distinguished as Buxus microphylla var. tarokoensis S.Y.Lu & Yuen P.Yang. Plants from China and Korea, formerly often cited as Buxus microphylla var. sinica, are now treated as a distinct species Buxus sinica.

Uses 
The species is grown as an ornamental plant, both in its native area and elsewhere in temperate regions around the world. It is particularly suitable for topiary or low hedging. Buxus microphylla var. compacta (Kingsville dwarf boxwood) and similar cultivars are frequently used for bonsai.

The cultivar ‘Faulkner’ ( tall by  broad) has gained the Royal Horticultural Society’s Award of Garden Merit.

In Japan, the wood of Buxus microphylla var. japonica can be used to make a hanko (seal).

References

microphylla
Trees of Korea